The 2013 UCI World Tour is the fifth edition of the ranking system launched by the Union Cycliste Internationale (UCI) in 2009.  The series started with the Tour Down Under on 22 January.


Teams

The UCI ProTeams compete in the World Tour, with UCI Professional Continental teams, or national squads, able to enter at the discretion of the organisers of each event.

Events
All events from the 2012 UCI World Tour are included.  For the second successive year, the Tour of Hangzhou was scheduled originally as part of the tour, but later withdrawn.

Notes

Final standings

Individual
Source:

Riders tied with the same number of points were classified by number of victories, then number of second places, third places, and so on, in World Tour events and stages.

 228 riders scored points. 30 other riders finished in positions that would have earned them points, but they were ineligible as members of non-ProTour teams.

Team
Source:

Team rankings are calculated by adding the ranking points of the top five riders of a team in the table, plus points gained in the World Team Time Trial Championship (WTTT).

Nation
Source:

National rankings were calculated by adding the ranking points of the top five riders registered in a nation in the table. The national rankings were also used to determine how many riders a country could have in the World Championships.

 Riders from 35 countries scored points.

Leader progress

References

External links

 
UCI World Tour
2013 in men's road cycling